Pax Pamir is a boardgame designed by Cole Wehrle, originally released in 2015 with a second edition published in 2019. It concerns the Russian, British, and Durrani empires struggling for dominance in Afghanistan, with players assuming the role of local leaders. Pax Pamir received positive reviews upon its release and was nominated for several awards.

Gameplay 
The board of Pax Pamir is a map of Central Asia; there is also a market from which cards are bought, and each player has their own tableau of cards, called a court. The map, covering the area from the Caspian Sea to northern Afghanistan and the Punjab, is divided into six areas. Players may place two kinds of pieces on the map: cylinders representing spies and local tribes, and blocks representing imperial power. When blocks are upright, they are armies, but when laid over the border between two areas are roads, allowing armies to move.

Cards in the market are arranged in six columns; freshly drawn from the deck, they are at their most expensive, but become cheaper as they remain unbought. Players pay for cards by placing coins on all the cards leading up to the one they buy; for instance, to buy a card in the 3-cost column, they place one coin each on the cards in the 0-cost, 1-cost, and 2-cost columns. When they buy a card, however, they gain all the coins on the card they buy. Most cards have a suit and immediate effects when bought, as well as providing the player with special abilities as long as they remain in their court. For instance, buying a card from the Military suit might provide the immediate effect of placing two army blocks on the map and give the player the ability to order armies to march and do battle. A few cards represent events that have an immediate effect; some of these trigger dominance checks.

Players are not wholly independent of each other but are grouped into three coalitions, supported by and ostensibly working for the Russian, British, and Durrani. Certain cards and actions increase a player’s standing with the empire they are allied with. This is relevant when a dominance check occurs: players examine the map to see if any empire has more blocks than the others. If one does, members of its coalition receive victory points, with more favored players gaining more. Otherwise, players with the most cylinders in play gain points. Loyalty to a coalition is temporary; it is possible to switch from one to another.

Although the game is usually played by 2-5 players, there is a solo mode with an automated opponent whose actions are determined by cards.

Theme 

Pax Pamir is based on Central Asia, beginning in 1823, after the fall of the Durrani Empire. Cards mostly represent individual people, including Afghans such as Dost Mohammed Khan and foreign adventurers such as Vasily Perovsky, but some represent places, institutions, or groups of people. There are cards for the Ark of Bukhara, opium fields, qanats, the East India Company’s India Pattern musket, Russian surveyors, British armies in India, and Durrani nobles; there is also one for Harry Flashman. Research for the game included various popular and scholarly books, such as Peter Hopkirk’s The Great Game, William Dalrymple’s Return of a King, Faiz Muhammad Kateb’s Siraj al-Tawarikh (a history of Afghanistan), and work by Malcolm Yapp, Christopher Bayly, and Frederick Cooper.

Wehrle designed the game to interest players in the topic of empire, and to express a postcolonial viewpoint centered on Afghans. The first paragraph of the rulebook states:

The game’s art is another way of communicating the setting, and almost every card has unique art. Most of the second edition's art was taken from the work of James Atkinson and James Rattray, who had been present in Afghanistan when the game is set. However, it also uses the work of Indian and Persian artists to add to the cosmopolitanism of the art styles. This extends to the box cover, which is purple, a color Wehrle describes as connected to Afghan political power.

Development history 
Wehrle began developing the game in 2012, influenced by Pax Porfirina, which concerned the rule of Porfirio Díaz in Mexico. The first edition was published in 2015 by Sierra Madre Games, co-designed by Phil Eklund, the company's owner and one of the designers of Pax Porfiriana. Described as the second game in the "Pax" series, it was packaged in a small box and used cards for the map. The cover used an 1878 cartoon by John Tenniel for the satirical magazine Punch, showing Amir Sher Ali Khan standing between a lion and bear symbolizing Britain and Russia, with the caption “Save Me From My Friends!” It was published just after Britain invaded Afghanistan, beginning the Second Anglo-Afghan War. Sierra Madre Games released an expansion, Khyber Knives, in 2016.

In 2017, Wehrle began working on a second edition with himself as sole designer. It was published in 2019 by Wehrlegig Games, a company comprising himself and his brother Drew. Differences compared to the previous edition include a larger box, and updated components including redesigned cards and a cloth map.

Reception 
Pax Pamir was nominated for several awards, including the Golden Geek Best Card Game for the first edition, and the Golden Geek Awards for Board Game of the Year, Best Strategy Board Game, and Most Innovative Board Game for the second edition. In addition, wargamer.com listed it as one of the best wargames from 2010–2020, and dicebreaker.com named it one of their games of the year.

Reviewers described the second edition as fast-moving and simple to learn, but with a high degree of player interaction and complexity, allowing clever tactics. Some also described it as easier to understand than the first edition. The art and components were also praised. However, some said that it was not for players who disliked harsh games, as players had many opportunities to betray each other.

The game’s political and historical themes were also commented on. Colin Campbell called it “a long way from the expand and exterminate basis of many colonization-era games”, and Dan Thurot said that it calls for empathy, showing the meaning of living in a land fought over by outside invaders. Adam Factor stated that the game presents a view of history as fluid and conditional rather than a series of grand events.

References

External links 
Wehrlegig Games website
BoardGameGeek page for Pax Pamir Second Edition

Board games about history
Board wargames set in Modern history